The 34th parallel north is a circle of latitude that is 34 degrees north of the Earth's equatorial plane. It crosses Africa, the Mediterranean Sea, Asia, the Pacific Ocean, North America and the Atlantic Ocean.

The parallel formed the southern boundary of the original Colony of Virginia as outlined in the London Company charter.

In the Confederate States, the parallel formed the northern boundary of Arizona Territory.

At this latitude the sun is visible for 14 hours, 25 minutes during the summer solstice and 9 hours, 53 minutes during the winter solstice.

Around the world
Starting at the Prime Meridian and heading eastwards, the parallel 34° north passes through:

{| class="wikitable plainrowheaders"
! scope="col" width="125" | Co-ordinates
! scope="col" | Country, territory or sea
! scope="col" | Notes
|-
| 
! scope="row" | 
|
|-
| 
! scope="row" | 
|
|-
| style="background:#b0e0e6;" | 
! scope="row" style="background:#b0e0e6;" | Mediterranean Sea
| style="background:#b0e0e6;" | Passing just north of Beirut, 
|-
| 
! scope="row" | 
|
|-
| 
! scope="row" | 
|
|-
| 
! scope="row" | 
|
|-
| 
! scope="row" | 
|
|-
| 
! scope="row" | 
|
|-
| 
! scope="row" | 
| Khyber Pakhtunkhwa
|-
| 
! scope="row" | 
|
|-valign="top"
| 
! scope="row" | 
| Khyber Pakhtunkhwa -  for about  Khyber Pakhtunkhwa Punjab - for about  Azad Kashmir - claimed by 
|-
| 
! scope="row" | 
|Jammu and Kashmir - Passing through Srinagar-claimed by  Ladakh - claimed by 
|-
| 
! scope="row" | Aksai Chin
|-valign="top"
| 
! scope="row" | 
| Tibet Qinghai Sichuan − for about   Qinghai Gansu Sichuan Gansu  Shaanxi  Henan  Anhui  Henan Anhui Jiangsu − for about   Anhui − for about   Jiangsu
|-
| style="background:#b0e0e6;" | 
! scope="row" style="background:#b0e0e6;" | East China Sea
| style="background:#b0e0e6;" | Passing by several islands of 
|-
| 
! scope="row" | 
| Port Hamilton islands
|-
| style="background:#b0e0e6;" | 
! scope="row" style="background:#b0e0e6;" | Korea Strait
| style="background:#b0e0e6;" | Passing just south of Tsushima Island, 
|-valign="top"
| 
! scope="row" | 
| Island of Honshū:— Yamaguchi Prefecture - passing through the northern suburbs of Shimonoseki Island of Shikoku:— Ehime Prefecture— Tokushima Prefecture Island of Honshū:— Wakayama Prefecture— Nara Prefecture— Mie Prefecture
|-valign="top"
| style="background:#b0e0e6;" | 
! scope="row" style="background:#b0e0e6;" | Pacific Ocean
| style="background:#b0e0e6;" | Passing between the islands of Miyakejima and Mikurajima,  Passing just south of San Miguel Island, California, 
|-
| 
! scope="row" | 
| California - Santa Rosa Island and Santa Cruz Island
|-
| style="background:#b0e0e6;" | 
! scope="row" style="background:#b0e0e6;" | Pacific Ocean
| style="background:#b0e0e6;" | Passing just south of Anacapa Island, California, 
|-valign="top"
| 
! scope="row" | 
| California - passing through Los AngelesArizonaNew MexicoTexasOklahoma - passing through Durant and HugoArkansasMississippiAlabamaGeorgia - passing through Kennesaw and AthensSouth Carolina - passing through ColumbiaNorth Carolina - passing through Kure Beach
|-
| style="background:#b0e0e6;" | 
! scope="row" style="background:#b0e0e6;" | Atlantic Ocean
| style="background:#b0e0e6;" |
|-
| 
! scope="row" | 
| Passing through Rabat and Fez
|-
| 
! scope="row" | 
|
|}

See also
33rd parallel north
35th parallel north

References

n34